The 2002 CART Grand Prix of Mid-Ohio was the eleventh round of the 2002 CART FedEx Champ Car World Series season, held on August 11, 2002 at the Mid-Ohio Sports Car Course in Lexington, Ohio.

Qualifying results

Race

Caution flags

Notes 

 New Race Record Patrick Carpentier 1:56:17.573
 Average Speed 106.680 mph

External links
 Friday Qualifying Results
 Saturday Qualifying Results
 Race Results

Mid-Ohio
Indy 200 at Mid-Ohio
2002 in sports in Ohio